A tectonic phase or deformation phase is in structural geology and petrology a phase in which tectonic movement or metamorphism took place. Tectonic phases can be extensional or compressional in nature.

When numerous subsequent compressional tectonic phases share the same geodynamic cause (usually some plate tectonic mechanism) this is called an orogeny. During an orogeny tectonic phases lead to mountain building, which causes deformation and metamorphism of rocks. In most Phanerozoic orogenies many tectonic phases are distinguished.

Tectonic phases in basin geology and sedimentary rocks
According to Steno's principle of original horizontality, sedimentary rocks are normally deposited as horizontal layers. When tectonic movement occurs sedimentary layers can be tilted. under such circumstances, the sedimentary planes will have a dip (an angle with a horizontal reference plane). When new sedimentary layers are deposited on top of tilted ones, they will have an angle with the older ones, a structure which is called an angular unconformity. Any angular unconformity is proof that a tectonic phase took place between the deposition of the layers below and on top of it.

It is important to know if the tectonic phase was a longer event or if it was local or regional. Tectonic phases can be important events that affected large areas. The Alleghenian orogeny in North America (during the Carboniferous period) for example can be found as an angular unconformity between rock layers in large parts of that continent.

When a tectonic phase occurred while sedimentation of new sediments continued, every new layer will have a slightly different dip from the one below. The result is a sequence of sediments that wedges out in one direction. This is usually the case on the margins of geologic basins.

Tectonic phases in metamorphic rocks
In petrology, metamorphic phases can be distinguished by analysis of minerals and microstructures (petrography) in metamorphic rocks. By analysing the sequence in which the minerals and structures were formed, more than one phase can be found in most metamorphic rocks (this is called polymetamorphism). By radiometric dating the absolute age of the different phases of mineral growth can be determined, showing when the rock was under certain pressure-temperature conditions. The obtained age is not necessarily the age of a tectonic phase, but can show when the tectonic phase ended and crystallisation of new minerals occurred.

See also
Structural geology
Tectonics

Tectonics
Structural geology
Petrology